This article is about the particular significance of the year 1964 to Nigeria and its people.

Incumbents 
 President: Nnamdi Azikiwe
 Prime Minister: Abubakar Tafawa Balewa
 Senate President:  Nwafor Orizu
 House Speaker: Ibrahim Jalo Waziri
 Chief Justice: Adetokunbo Ademola

Events
 February - Mid-West Region legislative election takes place with National Council of Nigerian Citizens winning the majority of seats
 October - Nigeria participates in the 1964 Summer Olympics and wins its first medal
 December - the Nigerian parliamentary election starts and continues into 1965
 The National Library of Nigeria whose construction started in 1962 opens
 Construction of the Kainji Dam begins
 The Nigerian Defence Academy is established

Births
 February 2 - Goodluck Nanah Opiah, politician and former speaker of the Imo State House of Assembly, Nigeria.
 Tubal Rabbi Cain, writer

Deaths
January 20 - Cyprian Michael Iwene Tansi, Roman Catholic priest who worked in Nnewi, Dunukofia, Akpu/Ajalli and Aguleri. and was later beatified by Pope John Paul II (born 1903)

References

 
Years of the 20th century in Nigeria
1960s in Nigeria
Nigeria
Nigeria